Gerard Anthony Faust (born May 21, 1935) is a former American football player and coach.  He served as the head football coach at the University of Notre Dame from 1981 to 1985 and at the University of Akron from 1986 to 1994, compiling a career college football record of 73–79–4.  From 1962 to 1980, Faust was the head football coach at Moeller High School in Cincinnati, Ohio, where he tallied a mark of 178–23–2 and won four mythical High School Football National Championships.  Before coaching, Faust enjoyed a successful stint as a quarterback at the University of Dayton, where he played under former Notre Dame coach Hugh Devore.  Faust was offered a partial scholarship to Notre Dame, but enrolled at Dayton, where he graduated in 1958.

Coaching career

Moeller High School
Faust had a highly successful run at Moeller High School in Cincinnati, Ohio from 1962 to 1980, where he built the program from scratch.  The Crusaders under Faust had a 178–23–2 record and included seven unbeaten seasons, four national prep titles, and five Ohio state titles in his last six seasons.  One of Faust's linebackers at Moeller was John Boehner, who later became a United States Congressman and the 61st Speaker of the United States House of Representatives.

Faust was inducted into the National Federation of State High School Associations Hall of Fame in 2004.

Notre Dame
It was his amazing high school record, sound ethics and the quality football players from Moeller who later played at Notre Dame, that led Notre Dame officials to take a calculated gamble and hire him when Dan Devine stepped down after the 1980 season.  For Faust, a devout Roman Catholic, it was a dream come true.  He had coveted the head coaching job at Notre Dame for years and said all along that he would never leave Moeller for anything else.  Faust inherited a solid squad that included nine of his former players from Moeller.  He switched the team's home jerseys from green back to blue, although initially it was a lighter Madonna blue shade than the navy blue that had been previously worn (and returned to in 1984), and kept the players' names on the backs.  A self-proclaimed eternal optimist brimming with enthusiasm, Faust had visions of winning more games and national championships and coaching at Notre Dame longer than anyone else.  Then when he saw Notre Dame's schedule, he was quoted as saying, "I hope my lifelong dream doesn't end in a nightmare."  It proved to be a prophetic statement and his era at Notre Dame, initially referred to as "The Bold Experiment", fell far short of expectations.

Faust's Notre Dame tenure started on a high note with a 27–9 victory over LSU in the 1981 season opener, one of the most widely anticipated games in school history.  After top-ranked Michigan lost to Wisconsin on the same day, Notre Dame was voted #1 in the polls.  The success was short-lived, however, as Michigan defeated Notre Dame the following week, 25–7.  It was all downhill after that as the Irish finished 5–6 that year, their first losing season since 1963.  Faust ended his stint at Notre Dame with a 30–26–1 record, never winning more than seven games in one season and never contending for a national title.  This included four consecutive losses against Air Force, whom the Irish had never lost to prior to 1982.  Despite his mediocre record and growing discontent among Irish fans, Faust was allowed to remain at Notre Dame for the entire duration of his five-year contract.

The highlights of Faust's tenure at Notre Dame included a 1983 Liberty Bowl victory over Boston College and an appearance in the 1984 Aloha Bowl.  His 1982 squad defeated Michigan by a score of 23–17 and upset the then top-ranked, Dan Marino-led Pittsburgh Panthers, 31–16.  In 1983, the Irish opened the season with a 52–6 win over Purdue while his 1984 team defeated Colorado by a score of 55–14 and posted a 44–7 rout over Penn State.

In exactly half of Notre Dame's losses under Faust, the opposition scored the winning points late in the game.  The Fighting Irish lost their last three regular season games in 1982, 1983 and 1985 and their last two games in 1981.  Only in 1984 did they finish strongly, winning their last four games after three consecutive home losses; the last time that had happened was in 1956.

Going into the 1985 season, hopes were high that things would turn around. With the team at 5–5 and the program rapidly unraveling after a 10–7 loss to LSU in the tenth game, Faust, who said he would never quit, announced his resignation effective at the end of the season and spared the university from having to fire him.  His final game was against a Jimmy Johnson-coached Miami team, a humiliating 58–7 loss at the Orange Bowl.  It was one of the worst defeats in school history and the second-highest point total ever given up in one game by the Irish; Army rang up 59 points in 1944 while Wisconsin matched Miami's 58 points in 1904.  Faust was succeeded by University of Minnesota head coach Lou Holtz.

Akron
In 1986, Faust was hired by the University of Akron after the school fired head coach Jim Dennison. Dennison, who is the Akron career wins leader for football, was forced out by university president, William Muse and athletic director, Dave Adams. Adams and Muse felt that Faust was more prepared to lead the Zips as they transitioned into a I-A institution. Faust struggled to get acclimated to the small budget school, compiling a 25-23-2 in his first five seasons with the Zips. In nine seasons (1986–1994), he achieved a record of 43–53–3. As was the case at Notre Dame, his Zips teams never won more than seven games in one season. Following a 1–10 finish in 1994, he was relieved of his coaching duties and became a fundraiser for the university. Faust's 43 wins placed him 3rd in Akron career wins leaders.

Personal and later life
Despite his unsuccessful coaching tenure at Notre Dame, Faust's love for the school has never wavered and he still regularly attends Irish home football games. He has said "I had only 26 miserable days at Notre Dame; that's when we lost.  Other than that, I was the happiest guy in the world. I loved walking on the campus, loved being there, loved being a part of Notre Dame."

On April 4, 1964, Faust married the former Marlene Agruso.  They are parents of three children and have six grandchildren. Their son, Steve, is a Notre Dame graduate.  Faust lives in Fairlawn, Ohio, a suburb of Akron.  He now works as a motivational speaker.

Head coaching record

High school

College

References

1935 births
Living people
Akron Zips football coaches
American football quarterbacks
Dayton Flyers football players
High school football coaches in Ohio
Notre Dame Fighting Irish football coaches
Players of American football from Dayton, Ohio
People from Fairlawn, Ohio